The McKee Bridge is a covered bridge in Jackson County in the U.S. state of Oregon. Built on land donated by Adelbert (Deb) McKee, a stage station operator, the bridge originally carried a road over the Applegate River that linked the Blue Ledge Copper Mine to Jacksonville. The site originally included an ore-hauler rest stop, about halfway between the mine and the city, where relief horses were stationed. An unincorporated community, McKee Bridge, is near the bridge.
 
Since 1956, area residents, assisted at times by government funding, have maintained the bridge, which is used by pedestrians but not by motor vehicles. McKee Picnic Ground in the Rogue River – Siskiyou National Forest is at the west end of the bridge along the river.

It is also the longest and oldest of the four.

Closed completely for three years because of rot in structural components as well as damage to the roof, the bridge reopened in June 2015 after major renovations. Grants totaling about $600,000 from the Federal Highway Administration, supplemented by matching funds of about $60,000 raised by the McKee Bridge Historical Society, paid for the project. Mowat Construction Company of Woodinville, Washington, carried out the rehabilitation.

See also
 List of bridges on the National Register of Historic Places in Oregon
 List of Oregon covered bridges

References

External links

1917 establishments in Oregon
Bridges completed in 1917
Covered bridges on the National Register of Historic Places in Oregon
Transportation buildings and structures in Jackson County, Oregon
National Register of Historic Places in Jackson County, Oregon
Tourist attractions in Jackson County, Oregon
Wooden bridges in Oregon
Road bridges on the National Register of Historic Places in Oregon
Former road bridges in the United States